Willie Carson (born 1942) is a Scottish jockey.

Willie Carson may also refer to:

Willie Carson (photo journalist) (1926–1996), Northern Irish photo journalist
Willie Carson (soccer), Scottish-American soccer player

See also
William Carson (disambiguation), a disambiguation page for William Carson